Rossie David Alston Jr. (born May 31, 1957) is a United States district judge of the United States District Court for the Eastern District of Virginia. He was formerly a Judge of the Court of Appeals of Virginia after having previously been a judge in the Prince William County Circuit Court and the Prince William County Juvenile and Domestic Relations District Court.

Biography 

Alston graduated from Averett University in 1979 and obtained his J.D. degree from the North Carolina Central University School of Law in 1982.  He began his career as a staff attorney for the National Labor Relations Board, a post he held for two years before going into private practice. He was elected by the Virginia General Assembly to be a judge of the Juvenile and Domestic Relations District Court for the 31st Judicial District, encompassing Prince William County, in 1998. He was elected to the Prince William County Circuit Court in 2001. While on the circuit court, he presided over the case of John Allen Muhammad, the mastermind of the D.C. sniper attacks, which brought him national attention. He was selected by his colleagues to be Chief Judge of the circuit court in 2007, when that position became vacant upon the elevation of LeRoy F. Millette Jr. to the Court of Appeals.  Alston was elevated to the Virginia Court of Appeals in 2009 to fill the vacancy created upon the retirement of Jean Harrison Clements.

Alston was known to be tough on violent criminals and those he thought had squandered second chances. He is quoted as saying "If you deserve the hammer, you're getting the hammer." But Alston also has a history of being compassionate, with one example involving a case in which a man whose 21-month-old child died in a sweltering van. The jury recommended a one-year prison sentence, however Alston instead ordered the father to spend a day in jail for seven years on the anniversary of his daughter's death and run an annual blood drive in her name.

On March 4, 2016, the state Senate Courts of Justice Committee certified Alston as qualified for a seat on the Virginia Supreme Court after the Senate nominated him to be elected to a twelve-year term. He was blocked by Democrats in the House of Delegates from joining the state Supreme Court.

Federal judicial service 

On June 7, 2018, President Donald Trump announced his intent to nominate Alston to serve as a United States district judge of the United States District Court for the Eastern District of Virginia. He was Trump's second African American federal judicial nominee. On June 18, 2018, his nomination was sent to the United States Senate. Trump nominated Alston to the seat on the vacated by Gerald Bruce Lee, who retired on September 30, 2017. On October 10, 2018, a hearing on his nomination was held before the Senate Judiciary Committee.

On January 3, 2019, his nomination was returned to the President under Rule XXXI, Paragraph 6 of the Senate. On January 23, 2019, President Trump announced his intent to renominate Alston Jr. for a federal judgeship. His nomination was sent to the Senate later that day. On February 7, 2019, his nomination was reported out of committee by a 20–2 vote.

On June 5, 2019, the Senate invoked cloture on Alston's nomination by a 74–19 vote. On June 10, 2019, his nomination was confirmed by a 75–20 vote. He received his judicial commission on June 12, 2019.

See also 
 List of African-American federal judges
 List of African-American jurists

References

External links 
 
 

|-

1957 births
Living people
20th-century American lawyers
20th-century American judges
21st-century American lawyers
21st-century American judges
African-American lawyers
African-American judges
Averett University alumni
George Mason University faculty
George Mason University School of Law faculty
Judges of the Court of Appeals of Virginia
Judges of the United States District Court for the Eastern District of Virginia
North Carolina Central University alumni
Lawyers from Washington, D.C.
United States Army soldiers
United States district court judges appointed by Donald Trump
Virginia lawyers
Virginia state court judges
Virginia circuit court judges